Francis Macnamara Calcutt (1819 – 16 July 1863) was an Irish Liberal and Independent Irish Party politician.

The son of William Calcutt and Dora Macnamara, he was elected as an Independent Irish Member of Parliament (MP) for Clare in 1857 but was defeated at the next election in 1859. He regained the seat as a Liberal MP in a by-election in 1860, and remained in post until his death in 1863. He had married Georgina Martyn in 1842.

He was High Sheriff of Clare in 1857.

References

External links
 

1819 births
1863 deaths
High Sheriffs of Clare
Irish Liberal Party MPs
UK MPs 1857–1859
UK MPs 1859–1865
Members of the Parliament of the United Kingdom for County Clare constituencies (1801–1922)